Richard Martin M. de Silva  (3 March 1903, in Galle – 12 August 1978) was a Ceylonese cricketer.  He was an all rounder, who represented Ceylon in the first ever first-class cricket match played in the country. R. M. M. de Silva also played for the Ceylonese against the visiting Marylebone Cricket Club in  1927  and was one of the best all-rounders of the Sinhalese Sports Club. He was educated at Richmond College in Galle, where he captained the college cricket team in 1921 and 1922. Later he served as a cricket coach for the school cricketers in Galle district.

References

External links
Martin de Silva at ESPNcricinfo
Martin de Silva at CricketArchive

1903 births
1978 deaths
Sportspeople from Galle
All-Ceylon cricketers
Alumni of Richmond College, Galle
Sri Lankan cricketers
Sinhalese sportspeople